Yeni yol (known as Leninabad until 1999) is a village and municipality in the Shamkir Rayon of Azerbaijan. It has a population of 2,012.  The municipality consists of the villages of Yeni yol and Füzuli.

References

Populated places in Shamkir District